The First Battle of Ürümqi was a conflict in the spring of 1933 between the armies of the Xinjiang provincial government under Jin Shuren and the Dungan New 36th Division (National Revolutionary Army) of the Nationalist government of China. The Chinese government secretly urged Hui General Ma Zhongying to attack Jin Shuren while at the same time assuring Jin that he was recognized as the legitimate Governor. Fierce fighting broke out at the gates of the city, and one of the Chinese commanders torched a street where the Muslims troops had managed to break through at the West Gate, killing everyone in the vicinity, including refugees. The Dungans were then forced to retreat into the range of machine gun fire, which killed many of them.

A White Russian force of 1,800 troops under Colonel Pavel Pappengut subsequently fought off the Muslim soldiers. Wu Aichen was told at least 2,000 had died by that point. The Muslims attempted to scale the walls at the Great West Bridge, and several were killed. The city was relieved when the provincial forces of newly incumbent Military Governor of Xinjiang (新疆督办) Sheng Shicai approached and the Muslim troops fled. Approximately 6,000 Chinese/Han and Muslim soldiers died in the fighting.

Notes

Conflicts in 1933
1933 in China
Xinjiang Wars